Andrew Michael Parrish (born 22 June 1988) is an English retired footballer.

Career
Parrish came through the ranks at Bury, signing a two-year professional contract in September 2005, before making a breakthrough in the 2005–06 season aged 17, when he made eight appearances. The 2006–07 season brought more first team action for him, where he made 10 appearances overall. He signed a new twelve-month contract in July 2007, and made a further 26 league appearances in 2007–08.

He joined Morecambe in June 2008 after being released by Bury at the end of the 2007–08 season. He plays at either right back or centre back. At the end of the 2015–16 season, he was among 3 players released by the club after spending 8 years at the Globe Arena. He was released by Morecambe in May 2016. Andy is currently a Youth Development coach for Manchester United and owns and runs online coaching platform Playerz, which launched in 2020.

References

External links
 

1988 births
Living people
Footballers from Bolton
English footballers
Association football defenders
Bury F.C. players
Morecambe F.C. players
English Football League players